, also known as Kō Kimura, was a Japanese actor. He entered the Haiyūza theatre troupe in 1946. He appeared in several films directed by Akira Kurosawa, including Stray Dog (1949) as Yusa the criminal, and Seven Samurai (1954) as Katsushiro, the youngest of the samurai. During his career he also appeared in several films directed by Mikio Naruse and Yoshishige Yoshida, as well as appearing in the Lone Wolf and Cub film series. In addition to a film career spanning almost thirty years, Kimura founded and directed an acting company which ultimately went bankrupt. He died of esophageal cancer.

Selected filmography

 Hawai Mare oki kaisen (1942) – Kurata
 The Love of Sumako the Actress (1947)
 Stray Dog (1949) – Yusa the criminal
 Angry Street (1950) – Joji
 Elegy (1951)
 Nakinureta ningyо̄ (1951)
 Dokkoi ikiteru (1951)
 Dancing Girl (1951) – Nozu
 Yamabiko gakkо̄ (1952)
 Boryoku (1952)
 Ikiru (1952) – Intern
 Shinkū chitai (1952) – Kitani
 Onna hitori daichi o yuku (1953)
 Pu-san (1953)
 Seven Samurai (1954) – Katsushiro Okamoto
 Okuman choja (1954) – Koroku Tate
 Ashizuri misaki (1954)
 Ningen gyorai kaiten (1955)
 Ofukuro (1955)
 Uruwashiki saigetsu (1955)
 Asunaro monogatari (1955) – Kashima
 Kyatsu o nigasuna (1956) – Takeo Fujisaki 
 Tengoku wa doko da (1956)
 Boshizо̄ (1956) – Shimizu
 Throne of Blood (1957) – Phantom samurai
 The Rice People (1957) – Senkichi
 Bibо̄ no miyako (1957)
 Jun'ai monogatari (1957) – Doctor at Segawa Hospital
 Anzukko (1958) – Ryokichi Urushiyama – the husband
 Kisetsufu no kanatani (1958)
 Summer Clouds (1958) – Okawa
 Kēdamonо̄ no torū michi (1959)
 Onna to kaizoku (1959) – Koshichi
 Hahakogusa (1959) – Yoshihiko Takayama
 Keishichо̄ monogatari: Iryūhin nashi (1959)
 Shiroi gake (1960)
 Yо̄tо̄ monogatari: hana no Yoshiwara hyakunin-giri (1960)
 Ikinuita jūroku-nen: Saigo no Nippon-hei (1960) – Takano, Army officer
 Kēnju yaro ni gо̄yojin (1961)
 Miyamoto Musashi (1961) – Hon'iden Matahachi
 Machi (1961) – News paper editor
 Hachi-nin me no teki (1961) – Kutsuda
 Knightly Advice (1962)
 Nippon no obaachan (1962) – Taguchi
 Gan no tera (1962) – Atsumichi Uda
 Watakushi-tachi no kekkon (1962)
 Miyamoto Musashi: Showdown at Hannyazaka Heights (1962) – Hon'iden Matahachi
 Seki no yatappe (1963)
 High and Low (1963) – Detective Arai
 Bushido, Samurai Saga (1963) – Hirotaro Iguchi
 Miyamoto Musashi: Nitо̄ryū kaigen (1963) – Hon'iden Matahachi
 Miyamoto Musashi: The Duel at Ichijoji (1964) – Hon'iden Matahachi
 Assassination (1964) – Tadasaburо̄ Sasaki
 Ware hitotsubu no mugi naredo (1964)
 Yoru no henrin (1964) – Saitо̄
 Bakumatsu zankoku monogatari (1964)
 Miyamoto Musashi: Ganryū-jima no kettо̄ (1965) – Hon'iden Matahachi
 Akutо̄ (1965) – Shioya Hangan
 Tange Sazen: Hien iaigiri (1966) – Yagyu Genzaburo
 Aogeba tо̄toshi (1966)
 The Affair (1967) – Mitsuhuru
 Tabiji (1967) – Eikichi
 Flame and Women (1967) – Shingo, Ibuki
 Black Lizard (1968) – Detective Kogoro Akechi
 Affair In The Snow (1968) – Kazuo Imai
 Snow Country (1969) – Shimamura
 Secret Information (1969) – Goro Izawa
 Chōkōsō no Akebono (1969)
 Sakariba nagashi uta: Shinjuku no onna (1970) – Funaki
 Tenkan no abarembo (1970) – Hanpeita Takechi
 Confessions Among Actresses (1971) – Director Nose
 Lone Wolf and Cub: White Heaven in Hell (1974) – Tsuchigumo Hyoei
 Pastoral: To Die in the Country (1974) – Film Critic
 Nagisa no shiroi ie (1978) – Toshihiko Kurahashi

References

External links
 
 

1923 births
1981 deaths
Deaths from esophageal cancer
Actors from Hiroshima
Deaths from cancer in Japan
20th-century Japanese male actors